"The Club Is Alive" is a song by British boyband JLS. It was released in the United Kingdom on 2 July 2010 as the lead single from their second studio album, Outta This World. It was also included in the American EP version of their debut album.

Background
Its lyrics sample "The Sound of Music", composed by Richard Rodgers, to lyrics by Oscar Hammerstein II and originally performed by Mary Martin in the stage musical of the same name, but was later popularised by Julie Andrews in the 1965 film. It was written by Andrew Frampton, Savan Kotecha and Steve Mac and produced by Mac. Inspired by the musical film The Sound of Music, the song was originally intended for American rapper Flo Rida, but he declined.

Critical reception
Robert Copsey of Digital Spy gave the song a positive review stating that JLS had "managed to successfully step outside their comfort zone", giving the song four out of five stars.

Music video
The video for the single was shot in May 2010 during the band's visit to Los Angeles, California, while recording their second album. Directed by Frank Borin, it takes its inspiration from the popular US TV series Entourage. The video shows the band turn up to a party in a nightclub in downtown L.A., where they also perform their song on a revolving stage.

Promotion
JLS performed the song on the fifth live semi-final of series 4 of Britain's Got Talent. On 11 July 2010, JLS performed the song on Alan Carr: Chatty Man and also gave an interview. The song was also performed at the Radio 1's Big Weekend in Bangor, Wales and T4 on the Beach, as well as on GMTV, Magic Numbers, T4 Stars of 2010 and The 5.19 Show.

Chart performance
"The Club Is Alive" debuted on the Irish Singles Chart on 9 July 2010 at number four where it remained for two consecutive weeks, marking the band's third top five hit in the country. On 11 July 2010, the song debuted on the UK Singles Chart at number one. It became their third number one single, selling 84,283 copies in its first week. Despite the initial success of the song, it dropped six places to number seven the following week and then a further two places to number nine on 25 July 2010. On 1 August 2010, the song dropped a further seven places to number sixteen.

Track listing
 "The Club Is Alive" – 3:36
 "Only Tonight" (Remix featuring Chipmunk) – 3:42

Wideboys Remix
 "The Club Is Alive" (Wideboys Stadium Mix - Radio Edit) – 3:19

Charts

Weekly charts

Year-end charts

Certifications

Release history

See also
 List of UK Singles Chart number ones of the 2010s
 List of UK R&B Singles Chart number ones of 2010

References

External links

JLS songs
2010 singles
Number-one singles in Scotland
UK Singles Chart number-one singles
Songs written by Steve Mac
Songs written by Savan Kotecha
Songs with music by Richard Rodgers
Songs with lyrics by Oscar Hammerstein II
Song recordings produced by Steve Mac
2010 songs
Songs written by Andrew Frampton (songwriter)
Epic Records singles